Yang Ling (born May 24, 1968 in Beijing) is a male Chinese sports shooter. He won both the 1996 Summer Olympics and the 2000 Olympic Games in 10 metre running target, being the only shooter to successfully defend an Olympic title in that event.

Olympic results

Other major performances
1994 National Champions Tournament - 1st 10m moving target 30+30
1994 National Qualification Tournament - 1st team, 2nd 10m moving target 30+30
1994 National Moving Target Championships - 1st 10m moving target mixed speed & 2nd 10m moving target standard speed
1996 World Championships - 1st 50m moving target team & 2nd 25m standard pistol 60 shots team

Records

References
 China Daily

1968 births
Living people
Chinese male sport shooters
Running target shooters
Olympic shooters of China
Shooters at the 1996 Summer Olympics
Shooters at the 2000 Summer Olympics
Olympic gold medalists for China
Asian Games medalists in shooting
Olympic medalists in shooting
Sport shooters from Beijing
Shooters at the 2002 Asian Games
Shooters at the 2010 Asian Games
Medalists at the 2000 Summer Olympics
Medalists at the 1996 Summer Olympics
Asian Games gold medalists for China
Asian Games bronze medalists for China
Medalists at the 2002 Asian Games
Medalists at the 2010 Asian Games
20th-century Chinese people
21st-century Chinese people